Creath is a surname. Notable people with the surname include:

Charlie Creath (1890–1951), American jazz musician and bandleader
Richard Creath (born 1947), American philosopher